Yanji West railway station is a railway station in Chaoyangchuan, Yanji, Yanbian, Jilin on the Changchun–Tumen railway.

References 

Railway stations in Yanbian
Railway stations in Jilin